Casella Waste Systems is a waste management company based in Rutland, Vermont, United States. Founded in 1975 with a single truck, Casella is a regional, vertically integrated solid waste services company. Casella provides resource management expertise and services to residential, commercial, municipal and industrial customers, primarily in the areas of solid waste collection and disposal, transfer, recycling and organics services. The company provides integrated solid waste services in seven states: Vermont, New Hampshire, New York, Massachusetts, Connecticut, Maine and Pennsylvania, with its headquarters located in Rutland, Vermont. Casella manages solid waste operations on a geographic basis through two regional operating segments, the Eastern and Western regions, each of which provides a full range of solid waste services, and larger-scale recycling and commodity brokerage operations. Organics services, major account and industrial services, are also provided.

Casella Waste Systems has 3,000 employees. Revenues were $1.085 billion for fiscal year 2022, up $195.9 million, or up 22.0%, from the fiscal year 2021.  Net income was $53.1 million for fiscal year 2022, up $12.0 million, or up 29.1%, from 2021.

"If you live in or near Boston," Barbara Moran wrote for Boston Globe Magazine in 2013, "there's a fairly good chance your recycling comes here, to Casella in Charlestown. The biggest material recovery facility in the state, it sits just north of Bunker Hill Community College, hard against the Interstate 93 northbound lanes, and trucks drop about 750 tons of household- and business-generated recycling here every day."

Expansion 
Casella acquired several businesses in 2018 including six solid waste collection businesses and one transfer business in its Western region and two businesses consisting of solid waste collection and transfer operations in the Eastern region.

As of January 31, 2019, Casella owned and/or operated 37 solid waste collection operations, 49 transfer stations, 18 recycling facilities, eight Subtitle D landfills, four landfill gas-to-energy facilities and one landfill permitted to accept construction and demolition ("C&D") materials.

On July 26, 2021, Casella purchased Willimantic Waste Paper Co. Inc., based out of Willimantic, CT. It was Casella's fifth acquisition in 2021.

References

External links 
 

Waste management companies of the United States
Rutland (city), Vermont
Waste companies established in 1975
Companies based in Vermont
Companies listed on the Nasdaq
American companies established in 1975